Phytoecia insignita is a species of beetle in the family Cerambycidae. It was described by Chevrolat in 1854. It is known from Palestine, Lebanon, Jordan and Syria. It feeds on Silybum marianum, and Centaurea hyalolepis.

References

Phytoecia
Beetles described in 1854